This is a partial list of people who lived in Silla, 57 BCE (traditional date) - 935 CE.

A
 Adalla, eighth ruler of Silla (r. 154-184).
 Ajagae, 9th-century rebel leader.

B
 Bak Hyeokgeose, legendary founder of the Silla kingdom.
 Beolhyu, ninth ruler of Silla (r. 184–196).
 Bidam of Silla, Greatest Rebel in Silla History

C
 Cheomhae, twelfth ruler of Silla (r. 247–261).
 Choe Chiwon, 9th-century philosopher.
 Crown Prince Maui, Crown Prince of the 56 King Gyeongsun of Silla.

D
 Deokman (the first women who ruled silla)

G
 Geom Mojam, 7th-century rebel leader.
 Girim Isageum, fifteenth ruler of Silla (r. 298–310).
 Gyeon Hwon, rebel leader who went on to found Hubaekje.

H 
 Heulhae, sixteenth ruler of Silla (r. 310–356).
 Hyecho, 8th-century monk and traveller.
 Hyogong of Silla, the 52nd ruler of the Korean kingdom of Silla.
 Hyegong of Silla, the 36th ruler of the Korean kingdom of Silla.

I 
 Ichadon, 6th-century monk and martyr.
 Ilseong, seventh ruler of Silla (r. 134-154).

J 
 Jang Bogo, ninth military leader.
  Jima, sixth ruler of Silla (r. 112-134)
 Jinji of Silla, 25th ruler of Silla
 Jinheung of Silla, 24th ruler of Silla, responsible for the immense expansion of Silla territory
 Jinpyo, eighth-century monk.
  Jobun, eleventh ruler of Silla (r. 230-247).
 Jinpyeong of Silla, 26th ruler of Silla (r. 597-632)

K 
 Kim Alcheon, seventh-century chief of the royal palace guard and bodyguard to Queen Seondeok.
 Kim Dae-Mun, eighth-century historian.
 Kim Heonchang, ninth-century rebel leader.
 Kim Inmun, seventh-century aristocrat.
 Mu-ryeok Kim, în general, sasea-lea.
 Kim Yang, ninth-century Silla viceroy. 
 Kim Yushin, Silla's greatest general.
 Kim Chunchu / King Muyeol, 29th ruler of Silla

M
 Michu, thirteenth ruler of Silla (r. 262–284).

N
 Naehae, tenth ruler of Silla (r. 196–230).
 Naemul Maripgan, seventeenth ruler of Silla (r. 356–402).
 Namhae, second ruler of Silla.

P
Pasa, fifth ruler of Silla.

S 
 Seol Chong, 8th-century scholar and son of Choe Chi-won.
 Queen Seondeok, twenty-seventh ruler and first reigning queen of Silla (r. 632-647).

T

Talhae, fourth ruler of Silla (r. 57-80).

U 
 Uisang, 7th-century monk and friend of Wonhyo.

W 
 Wang Geon, general who went on to found Goryeo.
 Woncheuk, 7th-century monk who spent much of his career in Tang China.
 Wonhyo, eminent 7th-century monk and scholar.

Y 
 Yi Alpyeong, village chief of ancient Silla.
 Yi Sabu, 6th-century general.
 Yuri Isageum, third ruler of Silla (r. 24-57).
 Yurye Isageum, fourteenth ruler of Silla (r. 284–298).

See also
 Silla
 List of Baekje people
 List of Goguryeo people
 List of Goryeo people
 List of Joseon Dynasty people
 List of Koreans

 
Silla people
Silla